Puzur-Suen (fl. late 3rd millennium BCE) was the 16th Gutian ruler of the Gutian Dynasty of Sumer mentioned on the "Sumerian King List" (SKL). According to the SKL: Puzur-Suen was the successor of Hablum. Yarlaganda then succeeded Puzur-Suen (likewise according to the SKL.)

See also

 History of Sumer
 List of Mesopotamian dynasties

References

Gutian dynasty of Sumer